Takashi Nomura (野村孝) (February 18, 1927 –  May 5, 2015) was a Japanese film director for studios including Nikkatsu. The Criterion Collection described him as a "prominent, stylistically daring director".

In 1955, he joined  Nikkatsu Film company and he made his director debut with Tokusōhan Gogō in 1960. Nomura directed such films as Itsudemo Yume wo and  Quick Draw Joe (1961).

He is perhaps best known for A Colt Is My Passport (1967), influenced by French New Wave filmmakers such as Jean-Pierre Melville, and by Sergio Leone-style Westerns. Nomura's use of still shots in the opening sequence has been compared to manga art techniques.

Film

Television
 Sengoku Rock Hagurekiba (1973) (ep.1 and 6)
 Akai Unmei (1976)
 Akai Kizuna (1977)
 Takahashi Hideki's Captain Series (1998-202)

References

External links

Japanese filmmakers
Yakuza film directors
University of Tokyo alumni
Kagoshima University alumni
People from Osaka Prefecture
1927 births
2015 deaths